Wave of Sorrow is an album by Mikhail Alperin and Arkady Shilkloper recorded in 1989 and released on the ECM label.

Recording and music
The album was recorded in July 1989. "The two draw heavily on Slavic folk influences, even as they mine the kind of airy, contemplative jazz harmonies associated with the ECM school".

Reception

Wave of Sorrow was released by ECM Records. The AllMusic review by David R. Adler awarded the album 4 stars, describing it as "An evocative, lyrical recording". The Penguin Guide to Jazz found the album attractive but predictable and inconsequential.

Track listing
All compositions by Mikhail Alperin
 "Song" - 6:35
 "Poem" - 4:23
 "Wave of Sorrow" - 6:23
 "Toccata" - 5:15
 "Unisons" - 4:29
 "Introduction and Dance in 7/4" - 4:32
 "Short Story" - 4:57
 "Prelude in B-flat Minor" - 5:33
 "Miniature" - 4:17
 "Epilogue" - 1:15

Personnel
 Mikhail Alperin – piano, melodica, voice
 Arkady Shilkloper – French horn, jagdhorn, fluegelhorn, voice

References

ECM Records albums
Mikhail Alperin albums
1990 albums
Albums produced by Manfred Eicher